Thomas Lockyer Jefferson (September 10, 1856 – April 2, 1932) was an American film and stage actor in mostly silent films.

Biography
He was born to Margaret Clements Lockyer (died 1861) and actor Joseph Jefferson. The Burns Mantle Yearbook reported that he was sixth in a line of famous Jeffersons.  He had leading roles in several films including The Grim Game (1919) with Harry Houdini. He also starred in two film adaptations of Rip Van Winkle as the title character, a role his father had performed on stage.

He toured the U.S. performing a starring role in the play Lightnin'. He married actress Daisy Jefferson and had three daughters from an earlier marriage.

Selected filmography

The Sable Lorcha (1915)
Only a Tramp (1915)
Under the Gaslight (1914)
The Seats of the Mighty (1914)
Rip Van Winkle (1914)
Classmates (1914)
No Place for Father (1913)
Olaf—An Atom (1913)
 The Mainspring (1916)
 Little Eve Edgarton (1916)
The Missing Links (1916)
An Old-Fashioned Young Man (1917)
 Polly Put the Kettle On (1917)
A Hoosier Romance (1918)
The Grim Game (1919)
The Other Half (1919)
The Spender (1919)
 Her Kingdom of Dreams (1919)
 Married in Haste (1919)
Hearts Are Trumps (1920)
 White Youth (1920)
The Little Grey Mouse (1920)
A Splendid Hazard (1920)
Help Wanted - Male (1920)
 The Girl in the Web (1920)
The Idle Rich (1921)
Rip Van Winkle (1921)
My Lady's Latchkey (1921)
 Straight from Paris (1921)
Beauty's Worth (1922)
The Son of the Wolf (1922)
 The Thoroughbred (1925)
Paid to Love (1927)
Soft Living (1928)
Ten Nights in a Bar-Room (1931)
Forbidden (1932)
The Hatchet Man (1932)

References

External links

1856 births
1932 deaths
American male silent film actors
American male stage actors
20th-century American male actors